Abdoulaye Khouma Keita (born 23 October 1978, in Rufisque) is a Senegalese former professional footballer who played as a defensive midfielder. He made one appearance for the Senegal national team in 1999.

He played on the professional level in Ligue 1 for AS Nancy.

References

1978 births
Living people
People from Rufisque
Senegalese footballers
Senegal international footballers
Association football midfielders
Ligue 1 players
ASC Jeanne d'Arc players
FK Dinamo Tirana players
Iraklis Thessaloniki F.C. players
AS Nancy Lorraine players
Toulouse Fontaines Club players
AS Beauvais Oise players
ÉFC Fréjus Saint-Raphaël players
Senegalese expatriate footballers
Expatriate footballers in Albania
Senegalese expatriate sportspeople in Albania
Expatriate footballers in Greece
Senegalese expatriate sportspeople in Greece
Expatriate footballers in France
Senegalese expatriate sportspeople in France